Brad Daugherty (born July 5, 1951 in Mountain Grove, Missouri) is a professional poker player.

Daugherty began playing poker in 1969 on a high school trip.  Following high school he worked in the construction industry, but after hearing of large prize money for tournament winnings, in 1978 he moved to Reno, Nevada.  In 1987 he won his first tournament.

He was awarded the first ever million-dollar first-place prize at the World Series of Poker when he won the bracelet in the 1991 Main Event, and finished in ninth place in 1993. As of 2009, his total live tournament winnings exceed $1,700,000. His 19 cashes as the WSOP account for $1,158,574 of those winnings.

Daugherty is the co-author with Tom McEvoy of Championship Satellite Strategy and No-Limit Texas Hold'em for New Players. He is married, has three sons, and currently resides in the Philippines, where he attempted to raise money for impoverished families by putting his 1991 WSOP bracelet up for auction on eBay twice in 2010 and 2011, with it going unsold both times due to bids not meeting his reserve price.

World Series of Poker Bracelets

References

External links

 Hendon Mob tournament results

1951 births
Living people
People from Mountain Grove, Missouri
American poker players
World Series of Poker bracelet winners
World Series of Poker Main Event winners
American expatriates in the Philippines